This is a list of the longer biographical articles from Rees's Cyclopaedia, 4 columns or more (3000 words appx.) The longest is that of Captain Cook (43.9 columns).

There are 3789 biographies half a column (350 words) or more long, and an unknown number of briefer ones. Sir James Edward Smith wrote the botanical articles, and Charles Burney the ones on music. Many of the biographical articles are sourced to biographical reference books. In most cases Christian names were Anglicised – John for Johannes, for example.

Vol 1 A-Amarathides

Vol 2 Amarantus–Arteriotomy

Vol 3 Artery–Battersea

Vol 4 Battery–Bookbinding

Vol 5 Book-keeping–Calvart

Vol 6 Calvary–Castra

Vol 7 Castramentation–Chronology

Vol 8 Chronometer–Colliseum

Vol 9 Collision–Corne

Vol 10 Cornea–Czyrcassy

Vol 11 D–Dissimilitude

Vol 12 Dissimulation–Eloane

Vol 13 Elocution–Extremities

Vol 14 Extrinsic–Food (part)

Vol 15 Food (part)–Generation (part)

Vol 16 Generation (part)–Gretna

Vol 17 Gretry–Hebe

Vol 18 Hibiscus–Increment

Vol 19 Increments–Kilmes

Vol 20 Kiln–Light

Vol 21 Lighthouse–Machinery (part)

Vol 22 Machinery (part)–Mattheson

Vol 23 Matthew–Monsoon

Vol 24 Monster–Newton-in-the-Willows

Vol 25 Newtonian Philosophy–Ozunusze

Vol 26 P–Perturbation

Vol 27 Pertussis–Poetics

Vol 28 Poetry–Punjoor

Vol 29 Punishment–Repton

Vol 30 Republic–Rzemien

Vol 31 S–Scotium

Vol 32 Scotland–Sindy

Vol 33 Sines–Starboard

Vol 34 Starch–Szydlow

Vol 35 T–Toleration

Vol 36 Tolerium–Vermelho

Vol 37 Vermes–Waterloo

Vol 38 Water–Wzetin

Vol 39 X–Zytomiers with Addenda

See also
 List of Rees's Cyclopædia articles

Rees's Cyclopædia
Biographical works